Zoriotar is a rural locality (a selo) and the administrative centre of Barchkhoyotarsky Selsoviet, Novolaksky District, Republic of Dagestan, Russia. The population was 1,104 as of 2010. There are 5 streets.

Geography 
Zoriotar is located 16 km southwest of Khasavyurt, on the bank of the Yamansu River. Charavali and Barchkhoyotar are the nearest rural localities.

Nationalities 
Chechens and Laks live there.

References 

Rural localities in Novolaksky District